The 1925–26 United States collegiate men's ice hockey season was the 32nd season of collegiate ice hockey in the United States.

Regular season

Standings

References

1925–26 NCAA Standings

External links
College Hockey Historical Archives

1925–26 United States collegiate men's ice hockey season
College